General (YPA) or General (JNA) was the highest rank of Yugoslav People's Army (in theory the second highest, after Marshal of Yugoslavia which was created for Josip Broz Tito and held by him alone). The only person to ever considered for promotion in rank of "General" was Ivan Gošnjak as deputy supreme commander. This rank was created in 1955 for deputy supreme commander of armored forces SFRY and it was abolished in 1974. After that the highest rank of Yugoslav People's Army was Army general for Yugoslav Ground Forces and Yugoslav Air Force, and Fleet admiral for Yugoslav Navy.

References

Bibliography
 

Military ranks of Yugoslavia
Five-star officers